Farid Belkahia (1934 - 2014) was a Moroccan modernist artist and education reformer. He served as the director of the School of Fine Arts of Casablanca from 1962 to 1974, during the period of the Casablanca school modernist movement. As an artist, he worked primarily in painting, metalwork and leatherwork.

Personal life 
He was born to a wealthy family in Marrakesh. His father's circle of friends included the Polish artist Olek Teslar  and the French artist Jeannine Guillou. Through Guillou, Farid Belkahia met Nicolas de Staël in 1937.

He continued his studies in Prague and returned to Morocco in 1962.

Art 
While he was influenced by the aesthetics of Western minimalism and modernism, he was also interested in visual cultures of Moroccan heritage, incorporating this into his work.

References 

20th-century Moroccan artists
People from Marrakesh
20th-century Moroccan painters
Moroccan male painters